Brandon Maurice Scott (born April 8, 1984) is an American politician serving as the mayor of Baltimore, Maryland, since 2020. The city of Baltimore uses a strong mayor-council structure for their government, meaning Scott holds strong mayoral powers. He is the former president of the Baltimore City Council and was a candidate for lieutenant governor of Maryland in 2018, as well as a representative for Baltimore's second district. On May 6, 2019, Scott was elected to replace Jack Young as council president after Young succeeded Mayor Catherine Pugh. In September 2019, Scott announced his candidacy for mayor and won the June 2020 Democratic primary. Scott won the November 3 general election and took office on December 8, 2020.

Early life and education 
Scott was born and raised in Park Heights, Baltimore. Scott has had a passion for local government since he was a child and always wanted to work for the city of Baltimore. As a child he admired Congressman Elijah Cummings and saw him as a role model. He ran track and cross country at Mergenthaler Vocational-Technical High School where he graduated in 2002. He went onto receive a degree in political science from St. Mary's College of Maryland in 2006.

Career

Political background 
After graduating from college, Scott worked as a liaison for City Council President Stephanie Rawlings Blake. In 2011, he was elected to serve as the city councilperson for the second district, making him one of the youngest ever elected to city office. He was the chair of the Public Safety Committee and a member of the Budget and Appropriations and Judiciary and Legislative Investigations committees.  In early 2018, he passed a bill creating an open data policy in Baltimore. As a council member, Scott oversaw the reinstatment of Council Oversight of the Baltimore Police Department. On May 2019, the Baltimore City Council unanimously voted to elevate Scott to serve as the City Council president, serving the remainder of the term of Bernard C. "Jack" Young, who ascended to the mayoralty following the resignation of Baltimore mayor Catherine Pugh.

Scott has participated in the 300 Man March, a nonviolence group. While serving as city councilperson, he voted against an aerial surveillance program for the Baltimore Police Department and supported reductions in police funding.

On February 16, 2018, Baltimore attorney Jim Shea announced the selection of Scott as his running mate in 2018 Maryland gubernatorial election. Scott would later appoint Shea to serve as Baltimore's solicitor under his mayoral administration.

2020 Baltimore mayoral election

Scott announced his campaign for mayor on September 13, 2019, at a press conference in his childhood neighborhood of Park Heights. On June 9, 2020, Scott was declared the winner of the Democratic primary, defeating the incumbent mayor Jack Young. Scott was perceived as more progressive than Young. This all but assured him victory in the November general election. Democrats have a nearly 10-to-1 advantage in registered voters, and for years the Democratic primary has been the real contest. As expected, he won the November 3, 2020, general election in a landslide, with a nearly 3-to-1 margin over his nearest opponent, independent Bob Wallace. For the second election in a row, the Republicans were pushed into third place.

Baltimore City Mayor (2020–present) 
Inaugurated in a small, socially distanced ceremony on December 8, 2020, Scott vowed to take on both "public health emergencies" — gun violence and the coronavirus. Taking the office at age 36, Scott is the youngest mayor in Baltimore's history.

COVID-19 pandemic
On his first day in office, Scott signed an order mandating an end to restaurant dining, both indoor and outdoor, and capping retail activity, religious gatherings, gyms, malls, casinos, and museums to 25 percent capacity. Scott lifted Baltimore's mask mandate and state of emergency declaration on July 1, 2021. In August 2021, Scott reinstated the city's mask mandate following a 374 percent increase in COVID-19 infections in July. The mask mandate expired on March 1, 2022.

In January 2021, Scott and Maryland governor Larry Hogan started a confidence campaign called "GoVax Maryland" encouraging citizens to get vaccinated. In February, Scott launched a new partnership with local universities to boost confidence in and combat misinformation about COVID-19 vaccines.

In March 2021, Scott expressed frustration with the Hogan administration after state health officials denied his request to set aside 50 percent of state's COVID-19 vaccine doses for the state-run mass-vaccination sites in the city. Hogan responded to these criticisms by telling him to "talk to his health department," which he claimed was telling the state health department to send vaccines elsewhere because they had too many. Scott refuted Hogan's charges, calling them "categorically untrue."

In May 2021, Scott delivered a letter to Hogan asking him to impose a temporary statewide eviction moratorium while local jurisdictions continued to distribute federal rent relief funding to tenants and landlords. In January 2022, Scott declined requests from housing advocates to institute an eviction moratorium in Baltimore, saying that he didn't have the power to do it on his own and that action would need to come at the state level.

Scott tested positive for COVID-19 on October 4, 2021. He returned to City Hall on October 15, 2021, after testing negative.

Crime and policing

During his mayoral campaign, Scott vowed to "reduce homicides by 15 percent each year in my term, getting us to below 300 homicides in my first year as mayor" by studying the flow of guns into Baltimore and implementing violence reduction strategies. He also rallied on reforming police spending after leading the charge to cut $22.4 million from the city's $550 million police budget, half of which was for "unallocated" funds. Despite this, Scott's first budget, introduced in April 2021, included a $28 million increase in the city's police budget. This proposed increase was met with criticism by Baltimore residents. Scott pushed back against this criticism by asking people to "look at the full picture behind violent crime rather than the "simple conflict" that leads to the loss of life." His budget was approved without amendments on June 8, 2021. In April 2022, Scott again proposed a $5 million increase in the city's police budget, which was met with further criticism.

In January 2022, Scott implemented the Group Violence Reduction Strategy in the City's Western Police District. This program targets outreach to individuals who are identified as being likely victims or perpetrators of gun violence within the city and stresses community based policing strategies. The four central tenets of the program are the reviewing of gun violence incidents, direct outreach, life coaching, and strategic policing. In December of 2022, Scott announced that the district had seen a 33.8% decrease in gun violence. It was also announced that this program would be expanded to other districts in 2023 and 2024.

In February 2022, Scott was named one of 10 new co-chairs of Mayors Against Illegal Guns.

In May 2022, Scott and the Baltimore Police Department launched the Strategic Management and Alternative Response Tactics (SMART) initiative. The goal of this program is to free up city resources by redirecting non-emergencies and mental health crisis to other services, while limiting false alarm calls. The program then in turn hopes to allow officers more time to engage positively with communities and build trust.  

In June 2022, Scott filed a lawsuit against Polymer80, alleging the company flooded the city with ghost guns that have contributed to bloodshed in the city's streets.In the same month, Scott also signed a bill to implement a Police Accountability Board as mandated by the States' General Assembly. The bill allows up to two former police officers to serve on the 17-person board that will recommend action against officers with alleged misconduct.

Housing
In May 2021, Scott removed owner-occupied homes that faced tax sale liens from the city's annual tax sale, an online auction that the city uses to collect overdue bills. In September 2021, he announced that Baltimore would purchase the liens of 454 owner-occupied homes to keep them out of the city's tax sale process. In April 2022, Scott removed all owner-occupied homes from the city's tax sale and postponed the auction until June.

In May 2021, Scott delivered his first veto of his mayorship on a bill that would give renters more options when paying security deposits.

In June 2021, Scott launched a fund to cover up to $2,000 in security deposits for low-income tenants, funded with $3.3 million in supplemental funds from a fiscal year 2020 pandemic-related Community Services Block Grant.

On January 25, 2022, a fire at an unoccupied rowhouse building killed three firefighters and left another on life support. In response to the fire, Scott announced a citywide review of its operations related to vacant properties.

In February 2022, Scott announced that the city would spend $90.4 million in funding received from the American Rescue Plan Act of 2021 to purchase two hotels to provide 275 beds for the city's homeless population.

Guaranteed income
In April 2022, Scott announced a guaranteed income pilot program to provide 200 young parents between the ages of 18 and 24 with payments of $1,000 per month over two years. The funding for the 4.8 million dollar project comes from the American Rescue Plan Act. The pilot program began distributing the funds to lottery winners in August of 2022. In order to enter the lottery, applicants needed to be below 300% of the federal poverty level, a parent or guardian of a child, and within the age requirements of program when the applications closed.

Transportation

In April 2021, Scott announced that he would be working to revive the Red line project that was killed by Governor Larry Hogan. The project plan to build an east-west rail line would have created a rise in economic development while also creating new connections for isolated low-income neighborhoods 

In June 2021, Scott announced his opposition to a proposal to construct a Maglev connecting Baltimore and Washington, D.C., delivering a letter to the Maryland Department of Planning urging them to reject the project.

In September 2021, Scott criticized the state's proposed transportation budget, which included $500 million in investments for the Purple Line in Prince George's County, for not including enough funding for infrastructure projects in Baltimore. In order to help prioritize projects in the city, Scott created The Mayor’s Office of Infrastructure Development in June of 2022 and appointed Matthew Garbark to head the department.

In November 2021, Scott joined President Joe Biden in a visit to the Port of Baltimore, where he hailed the Infrastructure Investment and Jobs Act as a plan to rebuild America and create "good-paying, union jobs."

In April 2022, Scott launched the "Lets Ride to Work" program, which is a partnership between Mayor's Office of Employment Development and Lyft which is being funded by the American Rescue Plan Act. The program would allow newly employed workers up to 40 free rides to and from work.

Personal life
Scott is unmarried and lives in Frankford, Baltimore. He has a cat named Madam Scarlet and a dog named Lord Grogu. His previous dog, Sir Charles of Baltimore, died from congestive heart failure in December 2020.

Electoral history

References

External links 
 

1984 births
21st-century American politicians
African-American city council members in Maryland
Mayors of Baltimore
Baltimore City Council members
Living people
Maryland Democrats
St. Mary's College of Maryland alumni
21st-century African-American politicians
20th-century African-American people
African-American mayors in Maryland